Field marshal was usually the highest military rank in various German armed forces. It had existed, under slightly different names, in several German states since 1631. After the unification of Germany it was the highest military rank of the Imperial German Army and later in the Wehrmacht until it was abolished in 1945. 

The vast majority of the people promoted to field marshal won major battles in wars of their time. Field marshals played a compelling and influential role in military matters, were tax-exempt, members of the nobility, equal to government officials, under constant protection or escort, and had the right to directly report to the royal family. In the Prussian military tradition, which set the tone for the 19th century and the German Empire, field marshals could only be promoted in wartime and the royal family was excluded, both resulting in the creation of the rank of colonel general with the rank of general field marshal in 1854. Both restrictions would eventually end with the first royals being promoted during the Franco-Prussian War in 1870, and later honorary promotions to foreign monarchs would follow. Adolf Hitler effectively disregarded the wartime prerequisite by two promotions in 1936 and 1938, though all subsequent promotions were during wartime.

Electorate (1356–1806) and Kingdom of Saxony (1806–1918)

Brandenburg-Prussia and the Kingdom of Prussia (1701–1870)

German Empire (1871–1918)

Weimar Republic (1918–33)
After the loss of the First World War, Germany was transformed into what became known as the Weimar Republic, which was established according to rules formulated under the Treaty of Versailles. These required the reduction of the German Army to 100,000 men, a reduction of the German Navy, and the abolition of the German Air Force. As a result of the new military arrangements, there were no field marshals created during the Weimar Republic.

Nazi Germany (1933–45)

See also 
 Field marshal (United Kingdom)
 Field marshal (Russian Empire)
 List of Swedish field marshals
 List of German colonel generals

Notes

References

Sources

 
 
 
 
 
 
 
 
 
 
 
 
 
 
 
 
 
 
 
 
 
 
 
 
 
 
 
 
 
 
 
 
 
 
 
 

 
 
 
 
 
 
 
 
 
 
 
 
 
 
 
 
 
 
 
 
 
 
 
 
 
 
 
 
 
 
 
 
 
 
 
 
 
 
 
 
 
 
 

 
Germany
German military-related lists